The British Rail Class 144 Pacer was a diesel multiple unit (DMU) passenger train built at Derby between 1986 and 1987. BR, seeking to procure improved derivatives of the earlier Class 141, placed an order with the manufacturers British Rail Engineering Limited (BREL) and Walter Alexander to construct their own variant, the Class 144. A total of 23 units were constructed. All units have now retired from mainline service, though the majority of the units have been acquired for preservation on heritage railways and in other uses. As of December 2022, 19 out of the 23 units have been purchased following withdrawal for this purpose, of which 15 units are in operational condition.

Background
By the beginning of the 1980s, British Rail (BR) operated a large fleet of  first generation DMUs, which had been constructed in prior decades to various designs. While formulating its long-term strategy for this sector of its operations, British Rail planners recognised that there would be considerable costs incurred by undertaking refurbishment programmes necessary for the continued use of these aging multiple units, particularly due to the necessity of handling and removing hazardous materials such as asbestos. In light of the high costs involved in retention, planners examined the prospects for the development and introduction of a new generation of DMUs to succeed the first generation.

In the concept stage, two separate approaches were devised, one involving a so-called railbus that prioritised the minimisation of both initial (procurement) and ongoing (maintenance & operational) costs, while the second was a more substantial DMU that could deliver superior performance than the existing fleet, particularly when it came to long-distance services. While the more ambitious latter requirement would ultimately lead to the development of the British Rail Class 150 and the wider Sprinter family of DMUs, BR officials recognised that a cheaper unit was desirable for service on the smaller branch lines that would not be unduly impacted by lower performance specs or a high density configuration. As such, work to progress both approaches was undertaken by BR's research department during the early 1980s.

During this period, a number of prototypes were constructed to explore different designs and approaches for implementing the railbus concept. One such vehicle was a single two-car unit, designated as the Class 140, that was constructed between 1979 and 1981. This prototype was introduced with much fanfare during June 1981. Initial testing with the Class 140 uncovered several issues, such as difficulty detecting the type via track circuits, this was reliably resolved by swapping the material of the brake blocks from a composite to iron. Two less easily addressable drawbacks were the high level of noise generated during transit, particularly on older jointed rails, which was a consequence of the railbus's direct connection between the underframe and suspension with the body that transmitted impact forces across the body. It was also observed that the inclusion of strengthening members in the mass-produced bus body added significantly to the overall production cost, which eliminated much of the cost advantage that was the primarily goal of the type.

The Class 140 was viewed to be an overall success, and thus BR issued an order for an initial production model, designated Class 141, to British Leyland during 1984 with production commencing thereafter. During its early years of service, the Class 141 experienced numerous issues, particularly with the transmission and ride quality; work undertaken at BR's direct resulted in the quick development of numerous improvements to at least partially address these shortcomings. When it came to ordering more railbuses, however, it was decided that instead of placing these follow-on orders for further Class 141, it would be more desirable to procure improved derivatives of the Class 141. Accordingly, BR placed orders for two new models of the Pacer family with separate manufacturers, these being the Class 142 and Class 143 respectively. Thereafter, another and final Pacer model would be ordered, this being the Class 144.

Description
A total of 23 Class 144 units were constructed. The first thirteen of the classnumbers 144001 to 144013are two-car units, while the remaining ten144014 to 144023have a third vehicle that was added later in 1987. These ten Pacers are the only ones to use intermediate vehicles.

Units are formed of two driving motors, one of which contains a toilet. The three-car units have an additional intermediate motor. All vehicles have standard-class seating only. The technical description of the formation is DMS-(MS-)DMSL. Individual vehicles are numbered as follows:
DMS: 55801–55823
MS: 55850–55859 (units 144014–144023 only)
DMSL: 55824–55846

As originally built, the traction arrangement of the Class 142 consisted of a 200-horsepower Leyland TL11 engine, a Self-Changing Gears mechanical automatic gearbox and a Gmeinder final drive unit on each car driving only a single axle. This propulsion arrangement was in part taken from the Leyland National bus, as well as shared with the earlier Class 141. Starting in the early 1990s, every member of the class was mechanically upgraded due to the original parts being determined to be a major source of unreliability. The most substantial change was the replacement of the Leyland-built engine with a more powerful Cummins LTA10-R as well as the original mechanical transmission being substituted for a Voith hydrokinetic unit.

The Class 144 units are equipped with BSI couplers. As a benefit of their high levels of similarities, Class 144 units were often replaced in service by Class 142 units, and vice versa.

Operations

British Rail
The first Class 144 units were delivered during 1986. They were produced specifically to perform local services sponsored by the West Yorkshire Passenger Transport Executive (since rebranded as Metro). As such, the fleet was painted in the crimson/cream West Yorkshire Metro livery, although three units (nos. 144011–013) were later repainted into Regional Railways livery. During the British Rail era, the type was normally used on services such as the Harrogate Line between York, Harrogate, and Leeds, the Huddersfield Line's Wakefield section between Leeds and Huddersfield, along with the Huddersfield branch of the Calder Vale line. Class 144s were also operated on Hallam Line between Leeds, Barnsley, and Sheffield; the Penistone Line between Huddersfield, Barnsley, and Sheffield; and the Pontefract Line between Wakefield and Pontefract.

The Class 144 was also tasked with additional routes, including the Leeds-Morecambe services, services between Scunthorpe and Adwick to Sheffield and Lincoln. More recently from 2008, they have been working between Manchester Victoria and Leeds (usually via Brighouse) amongst others. Prior to 1994, they were also used on Leeds/Bradford-Ilkley and Leeds/Bradford-Skipton services. These lines were electrified in 1994, and passenger services were operated by Class 308 electric multiple units.

Early operations of the type were marred by unreliability to the extent where the Class 144 was commonly substituted for at the last minute by either first generation DMUs or locomotive-hauled trains. Their poor serviceability was common to all production Pacer types. According to industry periodical Rail magazine, the Class 144's mechanical transmission was frequently attributed as being the largely single cause of these issues, while undesirable instances of wheel slippage was another common occurrence. As a consequence, the propulsion systems of not only the Class 144 but its Class 143 and Class 142 siblings were replaced after only a few years of service. This refit not only resolved much of the unreliability issues but also gave the Pacer greater acceleration through the installation of a more powerful engine.

Privatisation era

Since the privatisation of British Rail, the Class 144 has been operated by several franchises. The first private operator was Northern Spirit, which was later taken over by Arriva Trains Northern; the latter opted to refurbish its fleet between 2002 and 2004 to enable its continued service. Post-refurbishment, the units emerging in a new silver and red Metro livery complete with refurbished interior. In December 2004, the fleet was transferred to the then-new Northern rail franchise. Northern Rail replaced the silver and red Metro livery with Northern Purple and Blue. By April 2010, all Class 144s have been repainted into this new livery.

Around 2010, Northern Rail subjected their fleet of Class 144s to another refurbishment programme. 144006 was the first unit to be refurbished, it had also the first one to be refurbished in the joint Arriva Trains Northern/WYPTE Metro programme in 2002. The refurbishment enhancements involved numerous interior changes, including the installation of 'easy to mop' flooring, an extended area for bike storage at one end of the car by removing a bulkhead wall and extending the perch seats from three to four, repainted hand grips and stanchions, new dado side panels and repainted wall ends, retrimmed seats in the purple Northern Rail moquette, a repainted ceiling, and repainted driving cab.

During April 2016, Norther Rail's Class 144s were all transferred to the new franchisee Arriva Rail North; in turn, Northern Trains took over operations of the fleet on 1 March 2020.

Rail Vehicle Accessibility (Interoperable Rail System) Regulations 2008 and the subsequent Persons of Reduced Mobility - Technical Specification for Interoperability (PRM-TSI) require that all public passenger trains must be accessible by 1 January 2020. As originally delivered, the Class 144 does not meets this requirement and has to be withdrawn without modifications to become compliant. During the 2010s, the rolling stock leasing company Porterbrook proposed an extensive refurbishment of the Class 143 and Class 144 fleets with the purpose of satisfying the diverse needs of this requirement; it was noted that the envisioned modifications would necessitate a significant reduction in the number of seats available. All were to be withdrawn by December 2019. Northern ordered the Class 195 and Class 331 units to replace the Pacers, as well as taking on spare stock from other operators. However, due to the late delivery of the new trains, the 144s were to remain in service in the South Yorkshire area until the middle of 2020. Northern accordingly sought and received a dispensation allowing continued use until 31 August 2020, on certain specified routes only.

Withdrawal

Following the outbreak of COVID-19 in the UK in March 2020 and the resulting curtailment of passenger services, Northern withdrew the entire fleet prematurely and by mid-April had placed all 23 units in storage; 18 units at the Keighley and Worth Valley Railway and the remaining five at Heaton Traction Maintenance Depot in Newcastle upon Tyne. Three units were subsequently scrapped, while the other 20 were distributed to preservation groups and other non-railway users.

Class 144e

The Class 144 Evolution (or 144e) proposal was publicised by fleet owner Porterbrook in 2015, as a way of bringing the fleet into compliance with the PRM-TSI requirements and thus extending its life past the compliance deadline at the end of 2019. One unit, number 144012, was refurbished to the Evolution standard and displayed as a proof-of-concept of upgrades including;
installation of a universally-accessible toilet,
provision of two wheelchair spaces,
provision of a luggage rack and space for two bicycles,
installation of new Fainsa seats,
installation of passenger WiFi,
installation of passenger information displays and automatic voice announcements,
installation of CCTV in the saloon, along with forward-facing cameras in the cabs, and,
conversion of internal lighting from fluorescent to LED.
Porterbrook stated that it had paid £800,000 to prepare the demonstrator unit, but claimed that a price of £175,000 per vehicle could be achieved in volume production. It was planned that the demonstrator would enter public service in April 2015, but this was delayed until later in the year. Following withdrawal it was sold in 2021 to Network Rail, but later scrapped.

Incidents
A Northern Rail 3-car Class 144 unit caught fire near  in Rochdale on 21 November 2013.

Fleet details
A total of 23 Class 144 units were built. The first thirteen of the classnumbers 144001 to 144013are two-car units, while the remaining ten144014 to 144023have a third vehicle that was added later in 1987.

Preservation
Fourteen Class 144 units have been preserved in operational condition.

Operational

Non-railway use
Five Class 144 units have been acquired by non-railway organisations. Two of them, numbers 144001 and 144008, were distributed to community organisations via the Department for Transport's "Transform a Pacer" competition.

References

Further reading

144
144
Train-related introductions in 1986